The swimming events of the 1991 European Aquatics Championships were held in the Olympic Aquatic Centre, Athens, Greece which also hosted the swimming competition during the 2004 Summer Olympics.

Men's events

50 m freestyle

100 m freestyle

200 m freestyle

400 m freestyle

1500 m freestyle

100 m backstroke

200 m backstroke

100 m breaststroke

200 m breaststroke

100 m butterfly

200 m butterfly

200 m individual medley

400 m individual medley

4 × 100 m freestyle relay

4 × 200 m freestyle relay

4 × 100 m medley relay

Women's events

50 m freestyle

100 m freestyle

200 m freestyle

400 m freestyle

800 m freestyle

100 m backstroke

200 m backstroke

100 m breaststroke

200 m breaststroke

100 m butterfly

200 m butterfly

200 m individual medley

400 m individual medley

4 × 100 m freestyle relay

4 × 200 m freestyle relay

4 × 100 m medley relay

External links
Results on GBRSports

1991 in swimming
swimming
Swimming competitions in Greece
Euro
Euro